The Zembo Shrine Building, also known as the Zembo Mosque, is a Masonic building located in the Uptown neighborhood of Harrisburg, Pennsylvania. It is significant architecturally as an example of Moorish Revival architecture. Construction on the edifice was started in 1928, and opened the building in 1930.

Zembo Shrine is affiliated to Shriners International, a Masonic order and a philanthropic organization.

Ownership

The building was to be sold in 2018 to TempleLive LLC. The initial asking price was $950,000. According to news reports, the building was to be sold by the Zembo Shriners in order to facilitate the organization's mission of raising money for 22 children's hospitals. However, that sale fell through when the Beaty Group was unable to integrate the venue with other regional performing arts establishments. In late February 2022, the Board of Directors of Zembo Shriners announced that the building was no longer for sale and it would remain with the Fraternal organization.

Historic persons and events

The Zembo building has played host to many events throughout the history of Harrisburg, including Governor's Balls, graduation ceremonies, circuses, and social events.

Pennsylvania State Senator M. Harvey Taylor, for which a prominent Harrisburg bridge is named, served as Potentate of Zembo Shriners in 1932. 

On September 15, 1960, John F. Kennedy made a campaign stop at Zembo Shrine. 

On Tuesday, October 4, 2016, Hillary Clinton made a campaign stop at Zembo Shrine.

Sporting events
The Harrisburg Senators, a basketball team, played there during 1947−1951.

Gilles Poisson wrestled for the World Wide Wrestling Federation as Louis Cyr there, defeating Mike Paidousis on January 30, 1976.  Between 1964 and 1983, the World Wide Wrestling Federation and its successor the World Wrestling Federation ran at least 112 events which such notable performers as Arnold Skaaland, Bruno Sammartino, Killer Kowalski, Ernie Ladd, Lou Albano, Jimmy Snuka, The Wild Samoans, Rocky Johnson, and Hulk Hogan, among other notable stars of the era.

References

External links
Zembo history

Historic sites in Pennsylvania
Moorish Revival architecture in Pennsylvania
Buildings and structures in Harrisburg, Pennsylvania
Masonic buildings completed in 1930
Religious buildings and structures completed in 1930
Religious buildings and structures in Pennsylvania
Shriners